The Chicago Open was a golf tournament played in the Chicago area. A Chicago District Open was first held in 1914. From 1926 to 1928 it became a national event. It was held again from 1937 to 1941, although there was no event in 1939. The Hale America National Open Golf Tournament was held in Chicago in 1942 and the Chicago Victory Open was played from 1943 to 1948. It was revived again as the Gleneagles-Chicago Open Invitational in 1958 and 1959.

History
The 1937 event was played at Medinah Country Club, Medinah, Illinois from July 23 to 25 and was won by Gene Sarazen with a score of 290. Two courses, numbers 1 and 2, were used for the opening two rounds with the final 36 holes played on the number 3 course.

The 1938 event was played at Olympia Fields Country Club, Olympia Fields, Illinois from July 22 to 24 and was won by Sam Snead with a score of 207, a stroke ahead of Ralph Guldahl. Two courses, numbers 1 and 4, were used for the opening two rounds. Heavy rain affected play on the opening day and the scores were canceled, reducing the event to 54 holes with a cut after 18 holes. The final 36 holes were played on the number 4 course.

The 1940 event was played at Tam O'Shanter Country Club, Niles, Illinois from July 19 to 21 and was won by Dick Metz with a score of 278. Amateur Jim Ferrier led after the first round with a 66, while Johnny Revolta led after two rounds on 136. Revolta had round 74 and 69 on the final day while Metz scored 69 and 70. Ben Hogan had a final round 66 to tie Revolta for second place.

The 1941 events was played at Elmhurst Country Club, Addison, Illinois from July 18 to 20. Ben Hogan led by three strokes form Dick Metz at the half-way stage after rounds of 66 and 70. Hogan scored two rounds of 69 on the final day and won by two strokes from Craig Wood, who had two rounds of 67. Metz finished in third place.

The event was revived as Gleneagles-Chicago Open Invitational after the World Championship of Golf was canceled. It was played at Gleneagles Country Club in Lemont, Illinois in 1958 and 1959. The top prize money was $9,000. Ken Venturi won both events.

Winners

A Chicago District Open Championship was held in some years between 1914 and 1925. Winners include:
1925 Al Espinosa
1915 unknown
1914 Robert Gardner (a)

Notes

References

Former PGA Tour events
Golf in Illinois